Viking Gods is a 1982 board game published by TSR.

Gameplay
Viking Gods is based on Ragnarok, and to win, the Gods must either kill Loki or crush the army of Chaos itself, while Chaos has to destroy the Tree of Life - Yggdrasil.

Reception
George R. Leake III reviewed Viking Gods in The Space Gamer No. 61. Leake commented that "Despite many flaws in this game, it provides good entertainment for fans of Viking lore. It is inexpensive, and at least the components are durable and attractive. But if you find fantasy and mythology-oriented games unappealing, you should spend your [money] elsewhere."

In a retrospective review of Viking Gods in Black Gate, Ty Johnston said "Designed by Allen Hammack, Viking Gods proved a lot of fun, but that's to be expected from a game designer involved with early Dungeons & Dragons, especially Hammack's work on the game module The Ghost Tower of Inverness. And with cover art by Jim Holloway, Viking Gods really stood out on store shelves."

References

Board games introduced in 1982
TSR, Inc. games